A voiceless postalveolar fricative is a type of consonantal sound used in some spoken languages. The International Phonetic Association uses the term voiceless postalveolar fricative only for the sound , but it also describes the voiceless postalveolar non-sibilant fricative , for which there are significant perceptual differences.

Voiceless palato-alveolar fricative

A voiceless palato-alveolar fricative or voiceless domed postalveolar fricative is a type of consonantal sound used in many languages, including English. In English, it is usually spelled , as in ship.

The equivalent X-SAMPA symbol is S.

It originated with the Czech orthography of Jan Hus and was adopted in Gaj's Latin alphabet and other Latin alphabets of Slavic languages. It also features in the orthographies of many Baltic, Finno-Samic, North American and African languages.

Features
Features of the voiceless palato-alveolar fricative:

Occurrence

In various languages, including English and French, it may have simultaneous labialization, i.e. , although this is usually not transcribed.

Classical Latin did not have , though it does occur in most Romance languages. For example,  in French  "singer" is pronounced .  is descended from Latin , where  was pronounced .

Similarly, Proto-Germanic had neither  nor , yet many of its descendants do. In most cases, this  or  descends from a Proto-Germanic . For instance, Proto-Germanic *skipą ("hollow object, water-borne vessel larger than a boat") was pronounced .

This change took longer to catch on in West Germanic languages other than Old English, though it eventually did. The second West Germanic language to undergo this sound shift was Old High German. After High German, the shift most likely then occurred in Low Saxon. After Low Saxon, Middle Dutch began the shift, but it stopped shifting once it reached , and has kept that pronunciation since. Then, most likely through influence from German and Low Saxon, North Frisian experienced the shift.

Then, Swedish quite swiftly underwent the shift, which resulted in the very uncommon  phoneme, which, aside from Swedish, is only used in Colognian, a variety of High German, though not as a replacement for the standard High German  but a coronalized . See sj-sound for more details.

Voiceless postalveolar non-sibilant fricative

The voiceless postalveolar non-sibilant fricative is a consonantal sound. As the International Phonetic Alphabet does not have separate symbols for the post-alveolar consonants (the same symbol is used for all coronal places of articulation that are not palatalized), this sound is usually transcribed  (retracted constricted voiceless ). The equivalent X-SAMPA symbol is r\_-_0_r.

Some scholars also posit the voiceless postalveolar approximant distinct from the fricative.

Features
 However, it does not have the grooved tongue and directed airflow, or the high frequencies, of a sibilant.
Its place of articulation is postalveolar, which means it is articulated with either the tip or the blade of the tongue behind the alveolar ridge.

Occurrence

See also
Index of phonetics articles
Voiced postalveolar fricative
Cedilla

Notes

References

External links
 

Postalveolar consonants
Fricative consonants
Pulmonic consonants
Voiceless oral consonants
Central consonants
Labial–coronal consonants